The Fédération Internationale de Roller Sports (FIRS) was the world governing body for roller sports, including skateboarding, rink hockey, inline hockey, inline speed skating, inline alpine, downhill, roller derby, roller freestyle, inline freestyle, aggressive inline skating, inline figure skating and artistic roller skating. It was established in April 1924 in Montreux, Switzerland by two Swiss sportsmen, Fred Renkewitz and Otto Myer, who had close connections to the International Olympic Committee.

The FIRS gathered more than 100 national federations, including countries from every continent and they are affiliated with the International Skating Union.

A proposal to dissolve the federation and merge with the International Skateboarding Federation to form a new body known as World Skate was ratified in September 2017. Since 2017 World Skate has organised the World Roller Games, comprising all the world roller sport disciplines as regulated by the World Skate international federation.

FIRS
The FIRS aimed to foster the Roller Sports movement and participation on a global scale. Its areas of responsibility were as follows:
 Administration and Regulations
 Organizing international competitions
 Developing the movement worldwide
 Promoting

The authority of FIRS was recognized by the following organizations:
 International Olympic Committee (IOC)
 General Association of International Sports Federations (GAISF)
 International World Games Association (IWGA)
 Pan American Sports Organization (PASO)

FIRS recognized the following continental confederations:
 Africa - African Confederation of Sports of Roller Skating (ACSRS)
 Europe - Confédération Européenne de Roller Skating (CERS)
 Asia - Confederation of Asia Roller Sports (CARS)
 Oceania - Oceania Confederation of Roller Sports (OCRS)
 The Americas - Confederación Panamericana de Roller Sports (CPRS)

Each continental confederation comprises or recognizes, in turn, various national governing bodies and associations.

Skating is considered to be one of the most complete physical exercises that exist and enjoys huge popularity on a world level. According to the latest estimations, there are more than 40 million habitual users of recreational skates throughout the world.

FIRS Roller Hockey Competitions 

Club Competitions
Rink hockey World Club Championship
Roller Hockey Intercontinental Cup
National Teams Competitions

FIRS Roller Hockey World Cup
FIRS Women's Roller Hockey World Cup
FIRS Roller Hockey World Cup U-20

Disciplines and World Championships

 Men's Roller Derby World Cup and Women's Roller Derby World Cup organized by Blood & Thunder magazine, not FIRS.

See also

Association of IOC Recognised International Sports Federations

References

External links
 FIRS web site

Roller sports
Roller skating organizations
Sports organizations established in 1924
Roll